The Elysian Brewing Company is an American brewery, owned by AB InBev, that operates two pubs and a taproom in Seattle.

History

Elysian was founded in 1995 by Dave Buhler, Joe Bisacca, and Dick Cantwell. Cantwell had been a homebrewer who gained a reputation at the Duwamps Cafe, the Pike Place Brewery, and Big Time Brewing. Buhler is a former spirits wholesaler and Bisacca was a home brewer and a vice president at Seafirst Bank. The original location was opened in 1996 in the Capitol Hill neighborhood with a 20 barrel capacity.

The company operated a brewpub at the local GameWorks arcade between 1997 and 2002. In 2003, their pub and bistro, Tangletown, was opened near Green Lake. The company's largest location, Elysian Fields, was opened in 2006 near CenturyLink Field, which is often busy on game days.

In 2011, Elysian expanded its operations with a  production-only facility in the Georgetown neighborhood.

Beers

Seasonal
Seasonal beers include:

Pub specialties
Elysian Brewing Company brews many beers, which are only available at their brewpub and restaurant or are sometimes seasonally available on tap in some Seattle pubs. These include The Golden Boot, brewed in honor of Seattle soccer; Haleakala, named after Maui's easterly volcano; Hombre, a Mexican-style lager, brewed as a house beer for a local Mexican restaurant; and Xoxo, a nitrogen-infused, chocolate, chilli-spiced Irish-style stout often brewed around Valentine's Day.

Brews
The Wise ESB was the brewery's first beer. Elysian has won multiple awards for their beers. The Wise, Dragontooth stout, and Avatar Jasmine IPA have done well at the World Beer Cup. The brewery's beers earned it the Large Brewpub of the Year award at the Great American Beer Festival in 1999, 2003, and 2004.

Elysian had a collaborative partnership with the New Belgium Brewing Company of Ft. Collins, Colorado. The brewery also partnered with The Mens Room (a program on the Seattle rock music radio station KISW) to produce a red ale.

References

External links

 

Beer brewing companies based in Washington (state)
Food and drink companies based in Seattle
Manufacturing companies based in Seattle
1995 establishments in Washington (state)
American beer brands
AB InBev
Anheuser-Busch